Definitely Maybe is a 1994 album by Oasis.

Definitely Maybe may also refer to:

Film and literature
 Definitely, Maybe, a 2008 film by Adam Brooks
 Definitely Maybe (novel), a 1974 science fiction novel by Arkady and Boris Strugatsky
 Definitely Maybe, a 1998 Audley Memorial Hospital novel by Caroline Anderson
 "Definitely, Maybe", a 2011 Lucy Valentine short story by Heather Webber

Music
 Definitely Maybe, an album by Ampie du Preez
 "Definitely Maybe", a song by Ed Palermo Big Band, 2017
 "Definitely Maybe", a song by FM Static from What Are You Waiting For?, 2003
 "Definitely Maybe", a song by the Jeff Beck Group from Jeff Beck Group, 1972

See also
 Definite Maybe (disambiguation)